MC Trey, also known as Trey (born Thelma Thomas in Lami, Fiji), is a Fijian Samoan Australian vocalist, and hip-hop activist. She was nominated as one of Sydney's Top 10 Creative Innovators in the field of music and is a member of ARIA-nominated band Foreign Heights.

Career
Over the past 15 years, Trey has established herself as an artist within hip-hop and urban music in Australia.

She collaborated with Maya Jupiter (Channel V) and DJ Nick Toth as hip-hop trio, Foreign Heights. The second single off the Foreign Heights album, "Get Yours", earned them an ARIA nomination in 2007.

Off mic, Trey is a youth arts worker, who has been facilitating hip-hop music workshops for young people around Australia for over 10 years. Her work in this area was awarded a Vodafone Australia Foundation "World of Difference" grant, enabling her to co-ordinate music programs for at-risk and disadvantaged young people at Information and Cultural Exchange (ICE) in Western Sydney. These programs aim to further-develop participant's writing, communication and performance skills and encourage young people to tell their stories through hip-hop music.

Discography
Getaway feat. Savuto - Single (Tapastry): 2019
'''Daily - Single (Tapastry): 2017The Light - Single (Tapastry): 2013Foreign Heights - CD (Grindin’/Central Station Records): '07Tapastry Toons - CD (Tapastry Toons/Shock Records): '03Creepin' - CD/vinyl single (tv1/Sony Music) with Fatt Dex: '01Daily Affirmations - CD (Tapastry Toons/Mother Tongues): '00Universal Soldier - 12" (Tapastry Toons/Mother Tongues): '99Projectiles - US tour tape (Tapastry Toons): '98Projectiles'' - demo CD & Tape (Tapastry Toons) w/DJ Bonez: '96/'97

References

Australian people of I-Taukei Fijian descent
Year of birth missing (living people)
Living people
Fijian emigrants to Australia
Australian women rappers
Hip hop activists